James Emerson Delaney (August 12, 1924 – June 25, 1947), known professionally as Jimmy Doyle, was a welterweight boxer who died after a boxing match with Sugar Ray Robinson later in the hospital.

Background
A mixed-race Creole, Doyle was born James Emerson Delaney in Los Angeles on August 12, 1924, "Jimmy Doyle," was the son of Edward (originally Edouard) Delaney and Marie Elodie Barret, both from New Orleans, who moved to Los Angeles shortly after their marriage in 1921. Jimmy's father was born in 1886 to Joseph Georges Delaney and Elodie Landry, part of a French-speaking family of colored Creoles who hailed from the upper Bayou Lafourche country.

Professional career
"Doyle" made his debut as a professional boxer in 1941 and in 1947 lost to Sugar Ray Robinson by 8th round TKO. After the bout, Doyle went to the hospital, suffering from a severe head injury, where he died seventeen hours later.

Last fight and death
In 1947, Doyle challenged Sugar Ray Robinson for the World Welterweight Title. Robinson had the advantage in every round except the sixth, when he was staggered twice and received a cut over his right eye. A single left hook from Robinson, thrown as Doyle was attempting a right hook, ended the fight in the eighth round. Doyle fell backwards onto his back, hard. As the referee started counting, Doyle raised himself onto his elbows, and tried to use the ropes to gain his feet, but he couldn't. The bell ending the round struck as the referee counted off 'nine,' so Doyle was saved from a complete knock out by the bell. His handlers asked the ref to end the match, as Doyle was in no condition to go on.

Doyle was taken to St. Vincent's Charity Hospital immediately after the bout, where he failed to regain consciousness and died a few hours later. He was given last rites by a Catholic priest as Robinson rushed to the hospital.

Jimmy Doyle was fighting in Cleveland, since after suffering some heavy knockouts in California that state's boxing commission would not sanction him to fight again.  After his death, criminal charges were threatened against Robinson in Cleveland, up to and including manslaughter, though none actually materialized. Robinson's biographer Will Haygood stated during a September 25, 2010 book festival appearance that Doyle was pushing himself to fight to "buy his mother a house" and after Doyle's death in 1947, Robinson gave the earnings of his next four fights to Doyle's mother, so she could buy that house.

References

External links
 
 The story of the fatal fight is retold in the radio drama "Premonition of the Panther", a presentation from Destination Freedom

1924 births
1947 deaths
Boxers from Los Angeles
Welterweight boxers
Deaths due to injuries sustained in boxing
Sports deaths in Ohio
American male boxers
African-American Catholics
African-American boxers
Creole peoples
20th-century African-American sportspeople